Star Film was a film production company in the Dutch East Indies. Established by Chinese-Indonesian businessman Jo Eng Sek and Chinese cameraman Cho' Chin Hsin in 1940, it produced five black-and-white films in 1940 and 1941; two of these were directed by Jo, and the remainder were directed by Wu Tsun. Another film was under production when the studio was closed following the Japanese occupation of the Dutch East Indies. Star helped establish the careers of actors such as S Waldy and Elly Joenara, and produced screenplays written by Rd Ariffien and Saeroen; its output, however, is probably lost.

History
Star Film was established by Jo Eng Sek, who had previous film experience as co-producer of Si Tjonat (1929), and Shanghai-based cameraman Cho' Chin Hsin; for much of the life of the company, Jo would take the role of producer while Cho' would be on camera. The company's headquarters were located at Prinsenlaan, Batavia (now Mangga Besar, Jakarta). The company released its first film, Pah Wongso Pendekar Boediman, in April 1941. For this detective film, Star signed L. V. Wijnhamer Jr., an Indo social worker popular with the ethnic Chinese community. The film was a commercial success, allowing the company to expand.

Later Jo signed Rd Ariffien as a screenwriter; the studio touted this as a victory, owing to Ariffien's wide network as a journalist. He wrote a single work for the company, Tjioeng Wanara, based on the Sundanese legend as retold by M. A. Salmoen in a 1938 Balai Pustaka-published edition; this was directed and produced by Jo. Several actors cast for the film continued with Star for the remainder of its existence, including comedian S Waldy and future film producer Elly Joenara. However, Ariffien left Star owing to dissatisfaction over Tjioeng Wanara.

Star continued expanding, and Jo brought aboard Chinese director Wu Tsun, whose first film for the company was Lintah Darat. It had begun production before the release of Tjioeng Wanara and dealt with a family torn apart by dealings with a loan shark. This production received positive reviews. Star then produced a sequel to Pah Wongso Pendekar Boediman, again with Wu at the helm, and drew the journalist Saeroen as writer. In this film, titled Pah Wongso Tersangka, Star emphasised comedy, relying on the interactions between Waldy, Pah Wongso, and the comedian Sarip.

Saeroen wrote one more film for Star in 1941, Ajah Berdosa, before leaving the company. This film, which follows a villager named Mardiman over a period of several years in which he loses everything owing to his infatuation with a "modern" woman,  was advertised as "an extremely simple and touching story" and received positive reviews. By late 1941, Star was producing an adaptation of the One Thousand and One Nights, titled 1001 Malam. At the time several contemporary works were being adapted from Nights, including Tan's Film's Aladin and Koeda Sembrani, Populair's Film's Moestika dari Djemar, and Java Industrial Film's Ratna Moetoe Manikam.

By early 1942, the colonial government of the Dutch East Indies had become concerned with the possibility of an invasion by the Empire of Japan. This fear reached the general populace, and the February 1942 edition of film magazine Pertjatoeran Doenia dan Film reported that several studios would move away from the colonial capital of Batavia or go on a production hiatus. Star, though production of 1001 Malam was incomplete, was reported to be preparing to move. When the Japanese occupied the Indies in March 1942, Star was closed, never to reopen.

Filmography
Star Film produced six films in two years. All were feature length, black-and-white works, receiving wide releases in the Dutch East Indies. Some, such as Pah Wongso Pendekar Boediman, were reportedly screened as far away as British Malaya, China, and Singapore. Though its films were screened at least into the late 1940s, the company's output is likely lost.
Pah Wongso Pendekar Boediman (1940)
Tjioeng Wanara (1941)
Lintah Darat (1941)
Pah Wongso Tersangka (1941)
Ajah Berdosa (1941)
1001 Malam (unfinished)

Explanatory notes

References

Works cited

 

 
 

 

1940 establishments in the Dutch East Indies
1942 disestablishments in the Dutch East Indies
Mass media companies established in 1940
Mass media companies disestablished in 1942
Film production companies of the Dutch East Indies
Defunct companies of the Dutch East Indies